Sandra Milo (born Salvatrice Elena Greco; 11 March 1933 in Tunis) is an Italian actress, television personality, author, and musician. She won a Silver Ribbon best supporting actress award for each of her roles in Federico Fellini's 8½ and Juliet of the Spirits.

Career
She made her film debut in 1955 alongside Alberto Sordi in The Bachelor. Her first major role came in 1959 thanks to the producer Moris Ergas, in General della Rovere, directed by Roberto Rossellini.
She also appeared in his film, Vanina Vanini, but Rossellini's career was cut short after the film received harsh criticism at the Venice Festival.

After she got married, she retired from her acting career.

Until discovered by Fellini, Milo had mostly performed in comedies and melodramas. Although she was reluctant to make a comeback, Fellini convinced her to take on the role of the sexy, lightheaded mistress opposite Marcello Mastroianni in 8½. The movie, which won universal acclaim, failed to change the public perception of her and although she was cast in Juliet of the Spirits, most of her following endeavors were second-rate films.

In the mid-1960s, Milo was hostess of a television program in Rome.

She retired again from acting in 1968, only to make a second comeback in 1979. Her roles have shifted from that of the temptress to more stern middle-aged women.

In 2006-07 she toured Italy with the theatrical adaptation of 8 Women.

She married Moris Ergas with whom she had a daughter Deborah, and later married Ottavio De Lollis with whom she had two children, Ciro and Azzurra.

Sandra Milo is Roman Catholic.

Discography

Singles

Filmography

Films

Television

References

External links

 
 "Sandra Milo", Fandango 
 "Sandra Milo", The New York Times

1933 births
Living people
Italian film actresses
Italian stage actresses
People from Tunis
Nastro d'Argento winners
Italian television actresses
20th-century Italian actresses
21st-century Italian actresses
Tunisian people of Sicilian descent
Italian Roman Catholics